"Runner in the Night", written by Maureen Darbyshire and composed by Brian Wade, was the 's entry at the Eurovision Song Contest 1986, performed by the sextet Ryder, led by Maynard Williams.

Song information
Ryder won the right to perform at Bergen by winning the UK national final, A Song for Europe, where they were the sixth act to perform. At Bergen, the song was performed fifth on the night, after 's Ketil Stokkan with "Romeo", and before 's debut effort, "Gleðibankinn", by ICY. At the end of judging that evening, "Runner in the Night" took the seventh-place slot with 72 points.

The song was a contemporary rock offering, departing from the norm at the time in that the sextet played instruments themselves (including a set of electronic drums and keyboards) and did not use an orchestra. The song itself is about a man "running in the night" to a woman he has previously left, hoping he is not too late and that his former lover will forgive him and take him back.

Charts
The song placed at No. 98, not charting on the UK Singles Chart (the Top 75 songs) but as an addenda on the "Next 25" version of the charts. This was the worst commercial showing for a UK Eurovision entry since 1964, in which the entry that year didn't chart on the Singles Chart at all.

References

External links
Runner in the Night lyrics

Eurovision songs of the United Kingdom
Eurovision songs of 1986
1986 in the United Kingdom
Virgin Records singles
1986 singles
1986 songs